Radio Luna is a radio station in Montenegro. Its headquarters are in Plav. It is part of RTV Luna.

References 

Radio stations in Montenegro